David V was King of Georgia in the 12th century.

David V may also refer to:

David V, Catholicos-Patriarch of Georgia
a Caucasian Albanian Catholicos, see List of Caucasian Albanian catholicoi